Snow on Higher Ground is the debut album from actor Keegan Joyce. The album is acoustic, and described by Joyce to have an 'Australiana folk sound'.

Joyce first released music on his YouTube account in February 2016. He premiered the song 'New Bridge Over Deadman's Creek' with Jane Patterson, which would become Track 1 on the album.

The album was released on 1 September 2016, initially available on iTunes and Bandcamp. Later, Joyce released purchasable album notes and vinyl copy of the album (limited to 300 copies and featuring only songs by Joyce) on his website.

Track listing

Personnel
Keegan Joyce - vocals, acoustic guitar
Jane Patterson - vocals, violin
Gerard Carroll - mandolin

Production 
Terry Hart - recording engineer
Joe Carra - mastering

References

External links
 

2016 debut albums